The 2005 Northern Ireland Trophy was the first edition of the Northern Ireland Trophy snooker tournament, held from 17 to 21 August 2005, at the Waterfront Hall, Belfast, Northern Ireland. Matthew Stevens defeated Stephen Hendry by nine  to seven (9–7) in the final. Alan McManus made the highest  with 140. This was the only year the tournament was held as a non-ranking event; it would become a ranking tournament for the next three seasons.

The top 16 ranked players were invited, Paul Hunter and Stephen Lee did not participate. They were replaced by Ali Carter and 2005 World Champion Shaun Murphy. Northern Ireland players Mark Allen and Joe Swail were invited as wildcards along with Ding Junhui and Neil Robertson.

Prize fund 
The breakdown of prize money for this year is shown below:
 Winner: £23,000
 Final: £12,000
 Semi-final: £6,500
 Quarter-final: £5,000
 Last 16: £4,000
 Wildcard round: £4,000

Players who entered as wildcards received less prize money: Robertson received £3,500 for reaching the semi-final, Allen and Swail received £2,000 for reaching the quarter-finals while Ding received £1,000 for reaching the last 16.

Wild-card round

Main draw

References

Sources 

Northern Ireland Trophy
Northern Ireland Trophy
Trophy
Northern Ireland Trophy